Quernmore Park Hall is a grade II* listed Georgian country house which stands in a 20-acre estate in the village of Quernmore, part of the City of Lancaster district of England.

The house consists of a main 3-storey block with set back pavilions at each end. The main block is built of sandstone ashlar with 5 bays on three sides, a hipped slate roof and a central Ionic entrance portico. It has 15 bedrooms and 4 reception rooms.

History
The Quernmore Park estate was sold by the Crown to Roger Downes of Wardley in 1630, passed c.1675 to Sir Thomas Preston of Furness and then passed by marriage to Hugh Clifford, 2nd Baron Clifford of Chudleigh. It descended through the Clifford family until it was sold in 1794 to Charles Gibson of Preston. The present house was probably built by Thomas Harrison of Chester in 1795–1798, when the estate covered some 1900 acres (770 ha), which Gibson completely reorganised, creating new farms and fields. He died in 1823, after which it transferred to his son, also Charles, High Sheriff of Lancashire in 1827, who died soon after him in 1832. Charles Gibson senior's wife continued to live at the house after the death of her son.

In c.1842 the house was acquired by William James Garnett (1818–1873), a prosperous cotton merchant of Lark Hill, Salford, conditional on the widow Gibson remaining in residence until her death, which occurred in 1843. He then commissioned Alexander Mills to remodel the frontage (adding the portico) and the interior entrance hall. He served as MP for Lancaster from 1857 to 1864. It then passed down to his son, also William Garnett (1852–1929), who was a Justice of the Peace (J.P.), Deputy-Lieutenant and appointed High Sheriff for 1879 and then in turn to his son, diplomat William James Garnett (1878–1965), who was High Sheriff for 1937 and 1941. On his death the property devolved to his younger brother Noel Trevor Garnett, an overseas civil servant, and then on the latter's death in 1961 to his son William Francis Garnett.

The estate was sold in 1990 by William Francis to the Oldroyd family. The estate was for sale in 2012, with the house itself in 20 acres of grounds, for £2.5m. The Gardener's Cottage and Postern Gate Lodge are also on offer.

See also

Grade II* listed buildings in Lancashire
Listed buildings in Quernmore

References

External links
 Knight Frank sales details

Country houses in Lancashire
Grade II* listed buildings in Lancashire
Buildings and structures in the City of Lancaster